Nulji (reigned 417–458) was the nineteenth ruler (maripgan) of Silla, one of the Three Kingdoms of Korea.  He was the son of King Naemul and Lady Boban, who was the daughter of King Michu.

Nulji married the daughter of King Silseong of Silla, who nonetheless exiled Nulji's younger brothers as hostages to Goguryeo of northern Korea and as diplomats and influential architects to Wa of Japan.  Silseong also plotted to have Nulji killed, but with Goguryeo aid, Nulji was able to kill Silseong in 417, after which he ascended to the throne.

According to one story, in 418 Nulji sent a loyal retainer named Bak Je-Sang to rescue his brothers from Goguryeo and Wa.  He was successful in retrieving the brother who was held in Goguryeo, but he was captured while trying to rescue the one held by Wa.  Refusing to serve the Wa king, he died under torture.  The story of Bak's loyalty has endured as a popular Korean morality tale.

After these difficult events, Nulji worked to free Silla from Goguryeo domination.  He set up diplomatic relations with Goguryeo on an equal footing in 424, and established a military alliance with Baekje in 433 to help counter the Goguryeo threat. called Beakje-Silla alliance(Hangul: 나제동맹; Hanja: 羅濟同盟)

Nulji's reign saw the continuation of a long process of centralization in Silla, marked his father's change of his title to "maripgan" (마립간, 麻立干), which is believed to represent a higher level of authority than the previous title "isageum" (이사금, 尼師今).  Under Nulji's rule, patrilineal succession was officially established (Yang, 1999, p. 16).  After his death in 458, he was succeeded by his son Jabi, rather than by his brother.

Family 

 Grandfather: Kim Mal-gu (김말구), half–brother of King Michu.
 Grandmother: Queen Hyulye ( 휴례부인 김씨), of the Kim clan 
 Father: King Naemul
 Mother: Lady Boban, the daughter of King Michu
 Wife:
 Queen Aro, of the Kim clan (아로부인 김씨), daughter of King Silseong
Son: Jabi of Silla (r. 458–479, died 479)–was the 20th ruler of Silla
Daughter: Queen Josaeng, of the Kim clan (조생부인)
Son-in-law: Galmunwang Seupbo
Grandson: Jijeung of Silla (437–514) –was the 22nd ruler of Silla
Granddaughter: Queen Seonhye (선혜부인), of the Kim clan (왕후김씨)
Princess Chisul, of the Kim clan (후궁 : 치술공주 김씨), daughter of  King Silseong of Silla
Daughter: Princess Hwang (황아공주)

See also
 List of Korean monarchs
 Korean history
 Silla

References
 

Silla rulers
458 deaths
5th-century monarchs in Asia
Year of birth unknown
5th-century Korean people